The cadets of the United States Military Academy first began the practice of wearing class rings in 1835.  The United States Military Academy class ring has traditionally been worn on the left hand, but most recent graduates choose to wear it on their right hand, which is likely in response to the dilemma posed by wearing both a West Point ring and a wedding ring on the same finger.

Some graduates choose to wear both on their left hand.  While at West Point, the ring is worn so that the class crest is worn to the inside and closest to one's heart.  Upon graduation, the ring is worn so that the West Point crest is closest to the heart.

Class rings within West Point culture 
Ring Weekend is a tradition at the United States Military Academy where senior cadets are awarded their West Point class ring.  West Point was the first American school to have class rings. It is awarded to senior cadets shortly after the start of their senior year, after which there is a formal dinner and dance (called a "hop" in cadet slang) following the ceremony for the cadets and their guests.

After the ring ceremony, Firsties are mobbed by plebes reciting the "Ring Poop":

Ringknocker
The term "ringknocker" refers to the alleged custom of some graduates to gently rap their ring against a hard surface in social situations; this serves as an unobtrusive signal of their status to any other graduates in the vicinity. However, a negative social-networking connotation also associates with the term, in that the term "implies that if there is a discussion in progress, the senior (West) Pointer need only knock his large ring on the table and all Pointers present are obliged to rally to his point of view."

Ring design 
Cadets choose their ring several months in advance, selecting everything from size (the traditional large and heavy men's casting, or the less bulky women's version), color (white gold, yellow gold, or no-luster palladium), and stone (some rings are all gold and embossed with the West Point seal where the stone would have been set). Some cadets opt to "inherit" pieces of rings from other family members or mentors who have also graduated from West Point.

The rings are customized for each cadet, and there are very few standard-seen practices, save the use of symbol black onyx and gold to represent the school colors, but this is seen in a minority of rings.  West Point alumni may donate their rings to be added to the smelting pot when a new batch of rings are cast. Also, the stone from an older ring can be removed and placed into a new graduate's ring.

There are also ring-related souvenirs. Students can pick out items for family members made to resemble their class ring such as cufflinks, pendants, and pins. All these items of jewelry bear the same markings as the top of the ring: the words "West Point", the year the Cadet graduated (e.g., West Point 2005), and stones matching the cadet's class ring.

By longstanding custom, many graduates choose to present a miniature of the West Point ring as an engagement ring. President Eisenhower, then a young lieutenant, gave a miniature to Mamie Eisenhower as the couple's engagement ring.

Early Use
In early years, Class rings often contained a reverse motif seal crest that was often used for wax sealing of both official military and personal correspondence. This to aid the senders authenticity. Tradition has it that the seal was broken upon the owners death to prevent its use by other persons.

Miscellaneous
When Lt. General Lesley McNair was killed in action on July 25, 1944, as a result of being caught up in the intensive aerial bombing of Operation Cobra, the only relic relating to him that was recovered was his West Point class ring.  The ring was subsequently donated to the United States Military Academy by General McNair's widow, and is part of the Academy's collection.

References 

United States Military Academy
Rings (jewellery)